Condica claufacta is a species of moth in the family Noctuidae (the owlet moths). It is found in North America.

The MONA or Hodges number for Condica claufacta is 9700.

References

Further reading

 
 
 

Condicinae
Articles created by Qbugbot
Moths described in 1857